Anderson Timoteo Paredes López (born 20 March 1995 in Puerto Ayacucho) is a Venezuelan cyclist, who rides for Venezuelan amateur team Ángeles Hernandez–Orgullo Andino–Distribuidora Rairos.

Major results

2013
 National Junior Road Championships
1st  Time trial
2nd Road race
2015
 1st Young rider classification Vuelta a la Independencia Nacional
 2nd Overall Vuelta a Trujillo
 National Road Championships
3rd Under-23 time trial
6th Time trial
 6th Overall Vuelta a Venezuela
2016
 National Road Championships
1st  Under-23 road race
1st  Under-23 time trial
3rd Time trial
5th Road race
 2nd Overall Vuelta a Trujillo
1st Stage 5
 7th Overall Vuelta a Venezuela
1st Young rider classification
 10th Road race, Pan American Under-23 Road Championships
2017
 National Road Championships
1st  Under-23 road race
2nd Under-23 time trial
3rd Road race 
6th Time trial
 2nd  Road race, Bolivarian Games
 2nd Overall Vuelta a Venezuela
1st Young rider classification
 3rd Overall Vuelta a la Independencia Nacional
1st Young rider classification
2018
 3rd Overall Vuelta a Venezuela
 5th Time trial, South American Games
2019
 6th Overall Vuelta al Táchira
 7th Overall Vuelta a Venezuela
2020
 5th Overall Vuelta al Ecuador
2021
 Vuelta al Táchira
1st  Mountains classification
1st Stage 6 
 2nd Overall Vuelta al Ecuador
2022
 10th Overall Vuelta al Táchira

References

External links

1995 births
Living people
Venezuelan male cyclists
20th-century Venezuelan people
21st-century Venezuelan people